Friday ( is a 2016 Russian comedy film directed by Yevgeny Shelyakin.

Plot
The film shows a Friday evening in one posh Moscow nightclub, which is just celebrating the anniversary of its opening. In the club this evening the rich "mama's boy" Mikhail Bondar is having fun, who has his own big shoe producing company, although which is currently in crisis. He is very passionate, likes to argue and show off, but does not like to lose. Friends play a trick on him and offer him a dispute: he will serve the restaurant's attendees as a waiter until 3 am and if he gets 10,000 rubles a tip at the end of the evening he will win. As a prize, he will receive his friend's car or lose his. This task is difficult for Bondar who was born with the silver spoon and has a tough temper, but now he has to work hard to appease moody clients.

Cast
Danila Kozlovsky as Mikhail Bondar, the millionaire-waiter
Sergey Burunov as Igor Strizhevsky, club manager
Anton Shagin as Vitaly Belov
Katerina Shpitsa as Vera
Pavel Derevyanko as Gennady Antonov, psychologist
Maxim Emelyanov as Valentin Spivak, a friend of Goshi
Aristarchus Venes as Gosha
Nastasya Samburskaya as Lera, "tequila girl"
Kirill Pletnyov as Max
Evgeniya Khirivskaya as Elena Antonova
Yevgeny Stychkin as Ilya
Nikita Pavlenko as Arkady
Mikhail Politseymako as Lyosha
Azamat Nigmanov as Temir
Emmanuil Vitorgan as Sergey Viktorovich Dubravin, actor
Alexey Grishin as Andreas
Boris Khvoshnyansky as Nikas, the artist
Anton Shurtzov as Kostya, the waiter
Farhad Mahmudov as Ahmat, the chef
Irina Butanaeva as Ulmas
Sergey Chirkov as Yegor
Leonid Telezhinsky as Stas
Yan Tsapnik as Vadim Ravilevich, travel agency director
BadComedian as cameo

Production
The film was shot in the "Icon" club in Moscow.

References

External links
 

Russian comedy films
2016 comedy films